AE, Ae, ae, Æ or æ may refer to:

Arts and entertainment
 A.E. (video game), 1982 
 Ae (film), a 2022 Sri Lankan film
 Autechre, an electronic music group
 L'Année épigraphique, a French publication on epigraphy
 Encyclopedia Dramatica, often abbreviated æ
 Artix Entertainment, a video game developer and publisher

Language

Characters
 Æ or æ, a ligature or letter
list of English words that may be spelled with a ligature, including "AE" being rendered as "Æ"
 Ä or ä, a letter sometimes represented as "ae"
 Ae (Cyrillic), a Cyrillic-script letter
 Ae (digraph), a Latin-script digraph

Languages and dialects
 American English, the set of varieties of the English language native to the United States
 Avestan, a language, ISO 639-1 language code ae

People
 A. E. or Æ, a penname of George William Russell (1867–1935), Irish writer
 Anne Ellis (1875 - 1938), American writer
 Koichi Ae (born 1976), Japanese football player
 Alexander Emelianenko (born 1981), Russian mixed martial artist, with AE Team

Places
 Ae, Dumfries and Galloway, Scotland
 Water of Ae, a river
 United Arab Emirates, ISO 3166-1 and FIPS 10-4 country code AE
 .ae, the top level domain for United Arab Emirates 
 United States postal abbreviation for US armed forces in Europe

Science and technology
 Acoustic emission, the phenomenon of radiation of acoustic waves in solids
 Adobe After Effects, graphics software 
 Adverse event, any untoward medical occurrence in a patient or clinical investigation
 Aeon in astronomy, 109 years
 Aggregate expenditure, a measure of national income
 Almost everywhere, in mathematical analysis
 ASCII Express, computer software
 Authenticated encryption, a form of encryption
 Automatic exposure, a mode available on some cameras
 Canon AE-1, a camera

Other uses
 Æ or AE, a numismatic abbreviation for "bronze"
 Air Efficiency Award, a British medal 1942–1999 
 Ammunition ship
 Applied Engineering, a computer hardware retailer
 Mandarin Airlines, a Taiwanese airline, IATA designator AE
 Toyota Corolla, the fifth generation of which is referred to as "AE"

See also

 A&E (disambiguation)
 AES (disambiguation)